The Barcelona Workers' Congress may refer to:

Barcelona Workers' Congress of 1870